is a railway station in the city of Sanjō, Niigata, Japan, operated by East Japan Railway Company (JR East).

Lines
Higashi-Sanjō Station is served by the Shinetsu Main Line, and is 96.2 kilometers from the terminus of the line at Naoetsu Station. It is also a terminus of the Yahiko Line, and is 17.4 kilometers from the opposing terminus of the line at Yahiko Station.

Station layout

The station consists of one  ground-level side platform, which has a partial cut-out, and a single island platform  connected by a footbridge, serving four tracks. The station has a Midori no Madoguchi staffed ticket office.

Platforms

History
It was renamed Higashi-Sanjō on 15 August 1926. With the privatization of Japanese National Railways (JNR) on 1 April 1987, the station came under the control of JR East.

Passenger statistics
In fiscal 2017, the station was used by an average of 2733 passengers daily (boarding passengers only).

Surrounding area
 Sanjō City Hall

See also
 List of railway stations in Japan

References

External links

  

Railway stations in Niigata Prefecture
Railway stations in Japan opened in 1897
Stations of East Japan Railway Company
Yahiko Line
Shin'etsu Main Line
Sanjō, Niigata